Malillany Marín (born Malillany Marín Rodríguez; December 23, 1980 in Havana, Cuba) is a Cuban-Mexican actress and model.

Filmography

Awards and nominations

Premios TVyNovelas

Premios Bravo

References

External links

1980 births
Living people
Mexican telenovela actresses
Mexican television actresses
Mexican film actresses
Mexican female models
Actresses from Havana
21st-century Mexican actresses
Cuban emigrants to Mexico
People from Havana